Robert Spang McManama (born October 7, 1951) is an American retired professional ice hockey player. He played 99 games in the National Hockey League for the Pittsburgh Penguins and 37 games in the World Hockey Association for the New England Whalers from 1973 to 1976. He was also a member of the American national team at the 1972 and 1973 World Championships.

Career statistics

Regular season and playoffs

International

Awards and honors

References

External links 

1951 births
Living people
AHCA Division I men's ice hockey All-Americans
American men's ice hockey centers
Broome Dusters players
Harvard Crimson men's ice hockey players
Hershey Bears players
Ice hockey players from Massachusetts
New England Whalers players
People from Belmont, Massachusetts
Pittsburgh Penguins players
Sportspeople from Middlesex County, Massachusetts
Undrafted National Hockey League players